Gamtoos River or Gamptoos River is a river in the Eastern Cape Province, South Africa.

Course
The Gamtoos river system is formed by the Groot, the Kouga and the Baviaanskloof rivers. The latter is a tributary of the Kouga.

Although the rainfall in the catchment area is low, it supports a commercial irrigated agriculture in the lower catchment in which oranges, tobacco, citrus fruit and vegetables are grown. There is an estuary where the Gamtoos river enters the Indian Ocean. It is located between Jeffreys Bay and Port Elizabeth and the Gamtoos River Mouth Nature Reserve is in the area. The towns of Hankey, the oldest town situated in the Gamtoos river valley, and Patensie are situated in the lower catchment. Further inland are the towns of Steytlerville, Joubertina, Uniondale, Willowmore and Murraysburg.

Tributaries include the Loerie River, Klein River, Hol River, besides the Groot and the Kouga that form the Gamtoos.

History
Saartjie Baartman - the "Hottentot Venus" - was born around 1789 in the vicinity of the Gamtoos river.

In 1877 during a severe drought in the region, the Gamtoos River dried up completely.

Two bridges cross the Gamtoos close to its mouth in the Kouga. The original  bridge on the R102 was opened in 1895 in order to replace the ferry that had been in use up to that time. A modern concrete bridge was built during the construction of the N2 in the early 1970s.

Dams in the basin
Presently this river is part of the Fish to Tsitsikama Water Management Area.
Kouga Dam in the Kouga River

Ecology
In 1995 specimens of the Cape galaxias (Galaxias zebratus), a South African fish species endemic to the Cape Floristic Region, were found in the Krom River and subsequently they were also found in the Gamtoos River system. Until then it had been thought that its distribution was restricted to the area between the Keurbooms and the Olifants River. Although in South Africa this relatively delicate fish is only classified as near threatened, in Australia species of the same genus were driven to extinction by competing salmonids and other introduced species of fish.

See also 
 List of rivers of South Africa
 List of estuaries of South Africa

References

External links

Birding - Gamtoos River Mouth
IUCN Red List - Galaxias zebratus

Rivers of the Eastern Cape